HMS Hermes was a  protected cruiser built for the Royal Navy in the 1890s. She spent much of her early career as flagship for various foreign stations before returning home in 1913 to be assigned to the reserve Third Fleet. The ship was modified later that year as the first experimental seaplane carrier in the Royal Navy. In that year's annual fleet manoeuvers, she was used to evaluate how aircraft could cooperate with the fleet and if aircraft could be operated successfully at sea for an extended time. The trials were a success and Hermes was paid off in December at their conclusion. She was recommissioned at the beginning of World War I in August 1914 for service as an aircraft ferry and depot ship for the Royal Naval Air Service. She was torpedoed and sunk by a German submarine in the Straits of Dover that October, with the loss of 21 lives.

Design and description

Hermes was designed to displace . The engines were powered by 18 Belleville boilers.

Her main armament consisted of 11 quick-firing (QF)  Mk I guns. One gun was mounted on the forecastle and two others were positioned on the quarterdeck. The remaining eight guns were placed port and starboard amidships. Eight quick-firing (QF) 12-pounder 12 cwt guns were fitted for defence against torpedo boats. One additional 12-pounder 8 cwt gun could be dismounted for service ashore. Hermes also carried six 3-pounder Hotchkiss guns and two submerged 18-inch torpedo tubes.
 
The main guns were fitted with 3-inch gun shields and the conning tower had armour 6 inches thick.

Construction and service

Hermes, named after the Greek god Hermes, was laid down by Fairfield Shipbuilding & Engineering at their shipyard in Govan, Scotland on 30 April 1897, and launched on 7 April 1898, when she was named by Lady Kelvin. She was completed on 5 October 1899, and commissioned for service on the North America and West Indies Station by Captain Frank Hannam Henderson. She visited Bermuda and the West Indies in January 1900, and two months later arrived in Nassau, Bahamas with her shaft broken and boilers damaged. She served as the flagship of the North America and West Indies Station until late 1901 when she returned home to have her troublesome Belleville boilers replaced with Babcock & Wilcox boilers. The work was undertaken by Harland & Wolff at Belfast, where she arrived from Devonport in May 1902, in tow of the special service vessel HMS Traveller.

She was assigned to the Channel Fleet until 1905 when she was reduced to reserve at Portsmouth Royal Dockyard. The ship was recommissioned the following year as the flagship of the East Indies station, but she became the flagship of the Cape of Good Hope Station in 1907. Hermes returned home in March 1913 and was reduced to reserve as part of the Nore Command the next month.

Work began to modify her to accommodate three seaplanes in April to evaluate the use of aircraft in support of the fleet. Her forward 6-inch gun was removed and a tracked launching platform was built over the forecastle. A canvas hangar was fitted at the aft end of the rails to shelter the aircraft from the weather and a derrick was rigged from the foremast to lift the seaplane from the water. The guns on the quarterdeck were removed to allow for a seaplane to be stowed there in another hangar. A third aircraft could also be carried amidships, exposed to the elements.
 
Hermes was recommissioned on 7 May and loaded two unknown aircraft on 5 July, making nine flights with them before 14 July. For the trials she initially used a Borel Bo.11 and a Short Folder, but the Borel was damaged in a storm and replaced by a Caudron G.2 amphibian. This latter aircraft took off successfully while the ship was moving on 28 July, but the take-off platform only seems to have been used twice during this time. During the manoeuvers, she simulated a reconnaissance Zeppelin for the Red Fleet, commanded by Vice Admiral John Jellicoe. The Folder could only carry a small wireless transmitter because of weight limits and it would be launched to search for enemy ships and report back to Hermes which would retransmit its message with its more powerful transmitter. The aircraft made a total of about 30 flights before 6 October. The tests showed that aircraft required radio transmitters to usefully perform reconnaissance, that sustained use of aircraft at sea was possible and that handling aircraft aboard ship and on the sea imposed their own set of requirements that could not be met by converted land-based aircraft.

The ship was paid off on 30 December, but was recommissioned on 31 August 1914. Assigned to the Nore Command, she was used to ferry aircraft and stores to France. It is uncertain if the flying-off platform was reinstalled. On 30 October she arrived at Dunkirk with one load of seaplanes. The next morning, Hermes set out on the return journey but was recalled because a German submarine was reported in the area. Hermes sank off Ruylingen Bank in the Straits of Dover with the loss of 21 of her crew. In January 2017, two English divers were charged with failing to declare items removed from the wreck of Hermes, in contravention of the Protection of Military Remains Act 1986.

Notes

Footnotes

Bibliography

External links

 Highflyer class in World War I
 History of HMS Hermes
 HMS Hermes
 Experimental seaplane carrier Hermes

Highflyer-class cruisers
Ships built in Govan
1898 ships
Seaplane carriers of the Royal Navy
World War I aircraft carriers of the United Kingdom
Ships sunk by German submarines in World War I
World War I shipwrecks in the English Channel
Maritime incidents in October 1914